Nicholas Woodeson (born 30 November 1949) is an English film, television and theatre actor, and Drama Desk and Olivier award nominee.

Early life

Woodeson was born in Sudan and lived in the Middle East as a boy. He started performing at prep school in Sussex, and Marlborough College. He read English at the University of Sussex, and became involved in student drama productions, where he met Michael Attenborough, Jim Carter, and Andy de la Tour. He took part in the 1970 National Student Drama Festival.  Next was a season in rep at the Lyceum Theatre, Crewe, after deciding not to pursue an academic career. He won a scholarship to the Royal Academy of Dramatic Art (1972–74).

Theatre
His first work after drama school was a season at the Everyman Theatre, Liverpool (1974–75), in a company that included Jonathan Pryce (artistic director), Julie Walters, Pete Postlethwaite and Bill Nighy. He has worked in regional theatre in the UK and US, at the Hampstead Theatre Club, the Young Vic and the Almeida Theatre in London and at the Manhattan Theatre Club (Off-Broadway). He joined the Royal Shakespeare Theatre in 1982 and worked with them for seven years.  On Broadway his work includes Straker in Man and Superman (1978), Piaf (1981), Inspector Goole in An Inspector Calls (1995), and Burleigh in Mary Stuart (2009).  In 2011, he played Mr Prince in the National Theatre revival of Odets' Rocket to the Moon.  He has appeared in the West End in Funny Peculiar (1976), in Good (1982) (also Broadway), as Inspector Goole in An Inspector Calls (2009), as Bonesy in Jumpers (2003) (also Broadway), as Mussabini in Chariots of Fire (2012), and as Harold Wilson in The Audience (2015).  He has been in two productions of Pinter's 'The Birthday Party', playing McCann at the National Theatre in 1994, and Goldberg in the Lyric Hammersmith's 50th centenary production in 2008, and two productions of Pinter's The Homecoming, playing Lenny in the 25th Anniversary West End revival in 1991, and Max at the RSC in 2011.

In 2017, following the death of Tim Pigott-Smith, he took over the role of Willy Loman in the Royal & Derngate theatre's tour of Death of a Salesman, for which he was nominated for a UK Theatre Award as Best Actor in a Leading Role.

Film
Woodeson's first film work was a role in Heaven's Gate, released in 1980. By chance, he spent more time on location in Montana than any other actor in the film. He has also appeared in, among others, The Russia House (1990), The Pelican Brief (1993), Shooting Fish (1997), The Man Who Knew Too Little (1997) Titanic Town (1998), The Avengers (1998), Mad Cows (1999), Topsy-Turvy (1999), Dreaming of Joseph Lees (1999), Amazing Grace (2006), Hannah Arendt (2012), the James Bond film Skyfall (2012), Mr. Turner (2014), The Danish Girl (2015), Race (2016), Disobedience (2017), The Death of Stalin (2017) and The Hustle (2019).

Television
Woodeson's first network television work was playing a US marine in A Rumor of War (1980) starring Brad Davis. He played killer Michael Hennessy in the very first episode of Cracker (1993), starring Robbie Coltrane. In 1998 he appeared in Midsomer Murders “Death of a Hollow Man” as Avery Philips. He played SS-Gruppenführer Otto Hoffman in the acclaimed BBC/HBO production Conspiracy (2001), starring Kenneth Branagh, Stanley Tucci and Colin Firth. He portrayed Harman Grisewood, in the 2008 TV programme Filth: The Mary Whitehouse Story.<ref>[https://www.imdb.com/character/ch0085808/ IMDB – Harman Grisewood (Character) from '']Filth: The Mary Whitehouse Story (2008) (TV)</ref> He has guest starred on series such as Miami Vice, Midsomer Murders, A Touch of Frost, and Poirot.

In the two 2005–06 HBO/BBC TV series of Rome, he played Posca, the personal slave of Julius Caesar.  In 2007, he played Joseph Novak in 'Broken Souls', an episode of Foyle's War. In 2010, he appeared as Alexander Grozin, president of the fictional Eastern European state of Turgisia, in DR television production of Borgen. In 2013, he played William Corcoran, a proponent of Lamarckism, in the episode “Am I not Monstrous?” of Ripper Street. He also appeared in Agatha Christie’s Poirot “Dead Man’s Folly” as Detective Sergeant Hoskins. In 2014, he appeared as Volkov in the American miniseries The Assets, and as Algernon Wyse in a BBC TV adaptation of E. F. Benson's Mapp and Lucia. In 2014, he played Yaakov in "The Eichmann Show" for the BBC.  In 2016, Woodeson played the role of Reverend Matthew Denning in the BBC TV series The Living and the Dead. He has also appeared in episodes of New Tricks, George Gently and Holby City.  Woodeson played the lawyer, Thoyt in the BBC One 2017 television drama series Taboo''.

Personal life 
He lives in London with his family.

References

External links
 

1949 births
English male film actors
English male television actors
People educated at Marlborough College
Living people
Alumni of RADA
English trade unionists
English male stage actors